Malo is a town in the province of Vicenza, Veneto, Italy. SP46 goes through it.

Italian writer Luigi Meneghello was born in Malo in 1922 and remembered it in his first book Libera nos a Malo. Sights include the Villa Porto, a Renaissance patrician villa designed by Andrea Palladio.

Twin towns
 Peuerbach, Austria, since 1997

Sources

(Google Maps)

Cities and towns in Veneto